Lennea is a genus of legume in the family Fabaceae. 

It contains the following species:
 Lennea viridiflora, including var. novogaliciensis.

References 

Robinieae
Taxonomy articles created by Polbot
Fabaceae genera